Vaja is a town in Szabolcs-Szatmár-Bereg county, in the Northern Great Plain region of eastern Hungary.

Geography

References

Populated places in Szabolcs-Szatmár-Bereg County